Anonychomyrma arcadia is a species of ant in the genus Anonychomyrma. Described by Forel in 1915, the species is endemic to Australia.

References

Anonychomyrma
Hymenoptera of Australia
Insects described in 1915
Taxa named by Auguste Forel